Pyrgus ruralis lagunae, the Laguna Mountains skipper, is a butterfly of the family Hesperiidae. It is a subspecies of Pyrgus ruralis.

Overview 
The Laguna Mountains skipper is a small, black and white checkered butterfly belonging to the family Hesperiidae. It has a wingspan of about 1 inch (3 cm) and a fast, erratic flight pattern. This endangered butterfly is found only in Southern California, occupying areas of high elevation in the Cleveland National Forest in San Diego, California. Phenotype differences between males and females represented by more white coloration of wings of males compared to that of females. This taxon is one of two subspecies of the rural skipper, Pyrgus ruralis. The other subspecies, Pyrgus ruralis ruralis, occupies a much larger range stretching from British Columbia to Central California.

Habitat 
The Laguna Mountains skipper is endemic to Southern California. The two population areas vary in species richness. The Laguna Mountains are thought to have a single population while Palomar Mountain is thought to have 4 separate populations. The largest population size being 100 and 250 individuals respectively for each location. The larval host plant, Cleveland's horkelia (Horkelia clevelandii) can be found under yellow pines in rocky soil and is primarily responsible for larval nourishment and survival. Larval development has been found on sticky cinquefoil (Potentilla glandulosa) but is rare. Additionally adults rely heavily on the nectar from the Cleveland's horkelia (Horkelia clevelandii) for nourishment. Range, distributions, and population densities of the Laguna Mountains skippers are directly related to availability and population size of Cleveland's horkelia.

Life cycle 
Adults have 2 flight seasons each year, one in mid-spring and the other in late summer.  Females lay their eggs on the understory of the Horkelia clevelandii outer leaves.  Eggs take 12–14 days to hatch and about seven weeks for larva to reach full adult maturity.

Population decline 
The Laguna Mountains skipper's population decline is credited mostly to habitat destruction. Having a single larval host plant makes reproduction difficult if a given Cleveland's horkelia (Horkelia clevelandii) population encounters environmental stochasticity . Habitat destruction and degradation is primarily associated with urban and agricultural development as well as recreational activities. Most common degradation is affiliated with overgrazing and trampling of the Cleveland's horkelia (Horkelia clevelandii) by cattle leading to habitat fragmentation.  Due to their small, sensitive population size, any manipulation/disturbance to skipper habitat has large impacts on skipper populations.  Additionally, the Cleveland's horkelia (Horkelia clevelandii) sees population declines during dry season leading to Laguna Mountains skipper population declines. Because the Laguna Mountains skipper has no known predators, changes in population size is a direct result of habitat manipulation or environmental stochasticity. Furthermore, over collection of Laguna Mountains skipper populations by scientists pose as a potential threat to population size.

The Laguna Mountains skipper was listed a federal endangered subspecies on January 17, 1997. The California Endangered Species Act does not allow listing of insects, but the California Department of Fish and Game include it on their Special Animals list. January 2007 saw the Department of the Interior, Fish and Wildlife Service designate a critical habitat for the Laguna Mountains skipper. Critical habitat is defined as specific areas within the geographical area occupied by the subspecies at the time of listing and specific areas outside the geographical area occupied by the subspecies if the agency determines that the area itself is essential for conservation.  Approximately  in Southern California were designated critical habitat. This habitat is located under federal, state, and private ownership. Protection of habitat is crucial for successful conservation activity.  No effects on the Laguna Mountains skipper populations have been seen since the addition of this critical habitat.

References 
Sources
Black, S. H., and D. M. Vaughan. 2005. Species Profile: Pyrgus ruralis lagunae. In Shepherd, M. D., D. M. Vaughan, and S. H. Black (Eds). Red List of Pollinator Insects of North America. CD-ROM Version 1 (May 2005). Portland, OR: The Xerces Society for Invertebrate Conservation.
DEPARTMENT OF THE INTERIOR, Fish and Wildlife Service, 5OCFR Part 17, RINIOI8—AC84, Endangered and Threatened Wildlife and Plants; Proposed Rule To List the Laguna Mountains Skipper and Oulno Checkerspot Butterflies as Endangered
DEPARTMENT OF THE INTERIOR, Fish and Wildlife Service, 50 CFR Part 17, RIN 1018–AC84, Endangered and Threatened Wildlife and Plants; Determination of Endangered Status for the Laguna Mountains Skipper and  Quino Checkerspot Butterfly
DEPARTMENT OF THE INTERIOR, Fish and Wildlife Service, 50 CFR Part 17, RIN 1018-AU50, Endangered and Threatened Wildlife and Plants Designation of Critical Habitat for the Laguna Mountains Skipper

Citations

External links 
Documentation of Department of the Interior, US Fish and Wildlife Services 
Description of Cleveland's Horkelia Horkelia clevelandii 
California endangered insects 
Critical habitat of Laguna Mountain Skipper 
Butterflies and Moths of North America 
Cleveland National Forest webpage 

ruralis lagunae
Butterflies of North America
Endemic fauna of California
Fauna of the California chaparral and woodlands
Natural history of the Peninsular Ranges
Natural history of San Diego County, California
~
~
~
Endangered fauna of California
Butterfly subspecies